Papapostolou is a Greek surname. Notable people with the surname include:

Christos Papapostolou (born 1929), Greek chess master
Miltos Papapostolou (1936–2017), Greek footballer and manager
Periklis Papapostolou (born 1975), Greek football player

Greek-language surnames